Napoli Soccer played its first season in Serie C in 2004–05. Following the takeover of the defunct club by Aurelio De Laurentiis, a squad was completed in two weeks, with only a few players from the 2003-04 season being signed. The all-new team did not perform to the level of expectations, and lost out to Avellino in the playoff finals.

Despite the fact Napoli were playing in such a low division, they retained higher average attendances than most of the Serie A clubs, breaking the Serie C attendance record with 51,000 at one match.

Squad

Goalkeepers
  Emanuele Belardi
  Matteo Gianello
  Olivier Renard
  Antonio Saviano

Defenders
  Salvatore Accursi
  Simone Bonomi
  David Giubilato
  Gianluca Grava
  Giovanni Ignoffo
  Nicola Mora
  Tommaso Romito
  Alberto Savino
  Gennaro Scarlato
  Claudio Terzi

Midfielders
  Ignazio Abate
  Marco Capparella
  Luigi Consonni
  Karl Corneliusson
  Nicola Corrent
  Gaetano Fontana
  Fabio Gatti
  Leandro Guerreiro
  Francesco Montervino
  Cataldo Montesanto
  Robson Toledo

Attackers
  Emanuele Berrettoni
  Emanuele Calaiò
  Gennaro Esposito
  Piá
  Nicola Pozzi
  Gennaro Schettino
  Roberto Sosa
  Massimiliano Varricchio

Serie C1

References

S.S.C. Napoli seasons
Napoli